(Ridge Racer Type 4 in Europe) is a racing video game developed and published by Namco for the PlayStation. It is the fourth title in the Ridge Racer series and the last to be released for the PlayStation. It was released on December 3, 1998 in Japan and further released the following year in Europe and North America. It was later re-released on the PlayStation Network in 2011, again in 2023 for PlayStation 4 and PlayStation 5, and pre-loaded on the PlayStation Classic which was released on December 3, 2018. It is the first Ridge Racer series game on the PlayStation to use Gouraud shading on polygons.

Gameplay

R4: Ridge Racer Type 4 is an arcade-style racing game with a strong emphasis on powersliding around corners. Vehicles use one of two styles of powersliding depending on the make of car they select: Drift and Grip. Drift cars require players to tap the brake once while turning to break into a smooth powerslide while Grip cars requires players to alternate between brakes and gas while turning to powerslide.

Vehicles are earned by playing through the game's Grand Prix mode. Players select one of four teams; R.C Micro Mouse Mappy (France), Pac Racing Club (Japan), Racing Team Solvalou (Italy), and Dig Racing Team (United States), who each have varying difficulties, and one of four manufacturers; Age Solo (France), Lizard (United States), Assoluto (Italy), and Terrazi (Japan), which determines the style of car and powerslide type the player will use. In each race, the player must attempt to reach a qualifying position, with later stages requiring players to place in higher positions to qualify. Depending on the qualifying position in each race, players will be awarded a new vehicle, or an upgrade to their current one, based on their team and manufacturer, with better cars earned for reaching consistently higher positions (i.e. the best cars are earned by placing 1st in each match while the least impressive cars are earned by just clearing the minimum qualifying positions). There are a total of 320 vehicles earned by racing with every combination of team, manufacturer and qualifying position. If the players unlock all 320 cars, they will unlock an additional one modelled after Pac-Man, for a total of 321 vehicles.

The game also features Time Attack mode, in which players can attempt to get the fastest time on each course, and VS. Battle, a split-screen mode for two players (the first to appear in the home console series) and an undocumented PlayStation Link Cable mode, allowing four players to play simultaneously. Players can also create their own car decors and participate in Extra Trials against powerful prototype cars. The game is also compatible with the JogCon peripheral and the PocketStation device, which allows players to trade cars with friends.

Release
A peripheral, the JogCon, was released alongside the game, packaged in special editions. The device features a steering wheel type device in the middle of the controller to provide accurate control.

Soundtrack
R4: Ridge Racer Type 4 Direct Audio is the soundtrack to the game, released in 1999 by Namco. It was the second game soundtrack to be released in the Ridge Racer series and was composed in 1998 by the Namco Sound Team (Kohta Takahashi, Hiroshi Okubo, Asuka Sakai, Tetsukazu Nakanishi, and Koji Nakagawa). The new team was a change from the usual rave music theme that were supplied by Namco's old sound team, Sampling Masters, who worked on the first three installments: Ridge Racer, Ridge Racer 2, and Rave Racer, although Okubo had previously worked on Ridge Racer Revolution and with Nakanishi on Rage Racer. R4 instead explored music styles encompassing funk, breakbeat, acid jazz, UK garage, progressive house, and neo soul mixed with traditional Namco-styled synth melodies.

The track "Ridge Racer (One More Win)" features American singer Kimara Lovelace.

Reception

Contemporary
The game received "generally favorable reviews" according to the review aggregation website Metacritic.

Jeff Gerstmann of GameSpot and Next Generation gave positive reviews to the game. In Japan, Famitsu gave it a score of 35 out of 40.

Retrospective
James O'Neill of Push Square noted it as the best of the PS1 Ridge Racer games. Jeremy Peeples of Hardcore Gamer said in 2018 that "R4 remains a high mark for the series and no entry has quite topped it yet." In 2023, Time Extension ranked the game first on their "Best Ridge Racer Games" list. Polygon and GamesRadar have ranked the game among the best PS1 games. Den of Geek included the game on their list of "20 PlayStation One Games That Were Way Ahead of Their Time" for getting the balance of "arcadey" and "realistic" right, also noting it as one of the best-looking PS1 titles.

Sales
It was a commercial success in Japan, the United Kingdom, and the United States.

The game sold 759,527 units in Japan and 297,564 units in the United States, for a total of  units sold in Japan and the United States.

Notes

References

External links

R4: Ridge Racer Type 4 Direct Audio at VGMdb

1998 video games
Multiplayer and single-player video games
Namco games
PlayStation (console) games
PlayStation Network games
Racing video games
Ridge Racer
Sony Interactive Entertainment games
Video games developed in Japan
Video games set in 1999
Video games set in Japan
Video games set in Yokohama
Video games set in Los Angeles
Video games set in New York City